"She's My Kind of Girl" is a song written and performed by Benny Andersson and Björn Ulvaeus, who were later famous as members of ABBA.

Written for the Swedish movie Inga II: The Seduction Of Inga, the song was recorded in November/December 1969, most likely at Europa Film Studios. The song was originally released in March 1970 as the first Björn and Benny single. Two years later it was released in Japan, hitting #1 and selling half a million copies. Because of that Benny and Björn were invited to perform in the World Popular Song Festival in Tokyo, November 1972 and they brought Frida and Agnetha with them.

The song was subsequently put on the B-side of the Swedish issue of ABBA's "Ring Ring" (English Version) single, and on the Ring Ring album in some other countries (in spite of it having been recorded before ABBA was formed and featuring no contribution from ABBA's other members, Agnetha Fältskog and Anni-Frid Lyngstad). The song is also unusual in that it is the only track in the entire catalogue that appears in fake stereo. To date, there is no known mono-only version.

This song was used in the soft porn film Inga II: The Seduction of Inga in 1971 (directed by Joseph W. Sarno), along with the song "Inga's Theme". This film was released in the U.S and Sweden, but became a bigger smash in the U.S.

Charts

Weekly charts

Year-end charts

Sales

References

ABBA songs
1970 songs
Songs written by Benny Andersson and Björn Ulvaeus
Sony Music Entertainment Japan singles
1970 debut singles